The Red Beret (aka The Red Devils, The Big Jump and retitled Paratrooper for the US release) is a 1953 British-American war film directed by Terence Young and starring Alan Ladd, Leo Genn and Susan Stephen.

The Red Beret is the fictional story about an American who enlists in the British Parachute Regiment in 1940, claiming to be a Canadian. It was the first film made by Irving Allen and Albert R. Broccoli's Warwick Films, with many of the crew later working on various films for Warwick Films and Broccoli's Eon Productions. It is partly based on the 1950 non-fiction book with the same title written by Hilary Saint George Saunders, about the Parachute Regiment and its second operation, Operation Biting, in February 1942.

Plot
Steve MacKendrick (Alan Ladd), nicknamed "Canada" because he claims he is from the country, volunteers in 1940 for the British military's parachute training facility. He has much more experience and leadership skills than he admits. Canada tries to become better acquainted with a pretty parachute rigger named Penny Gardner (Susan Stephen). She is initially put off by his attitude, but they eventually start dating. Both Penny and his new commander, Major Snow (Leo Genn), see potential (and a mystery that does not add up) in him, despite his strong efforts to avoid assuming any responsibility. Canada turns down Snow's offer to send him to officer school.

After completing parachute school, Canada's unit goes on a raid on the German radar station at Bruneval. An RAF radar expert, Flight Sergeant Box (John Boxer), accompanies the raiders to retrieve a key component to take back to Britain. The mission is a success, but Corporal Dawes (Michael Kelly), one of the men in Canada's outfit, hurts both his legs in the drop.

Back in Britain, after visiting Dawes, Canada is recognised by an American airman. He tells Penny that he resigned his commission from the USAAF after ordering his best friend and co-pilot to parachute out of their bomber when an experimental rocket got stuck. His friend was killed when his parachute did not open properly. Canada blamed himself and refuses any responsibility that might endanger anyone's life. When Snow confronts Canada with what he has learned (from a security investigation that he has ordered), Canada wrongly assumes that Penny told what she learned, and he breaks up with her. However just before he boards his plane on his next mission, they exchange a smile suggesting they have made up.

The unit's next operation involves attacking and destroying an airfield at Bône during the invasion of North Africa. With Lt Col Snow wounded and the men trapped in a minefield, Canada must risk others to extricate the unit. One of his friends, Poleski (Anton Diffring), who is Polish, finds a bazooka, so he decides to use it to blow a path though the minefield. Canada, the Pole and Taffy Evans (Donald Houston) use it to extricate their unit, while Snow and the rest of the men cover them. Although Snow and most of the men get out, the regimental sergeant major (Harry Andrews) dies from the wounds he received when he entered the minefield. Afterward, Canada promises to think about the commission Snow offered him.

Cast

 Alan Ladd as Steve "Canada" McKendrick
 Leo Genn as Lt Col John Snow
 Susan Stephen as Penny Gardner
 Harry Andrews as R.S.M. Cameron
 Donald Houston as Taffy Evans
 Anthony Bushell as Major General Whiting
 Patric Doonan as Flash Gordon
 Stanley Baker as Sergeant Breton
 Lana Morris as "Pinky"
 Tim Turner as Rupert
 Michael Kelly as Corporal Dawes
 Anton Diffring as the Pole (Poleski)
 Thomas Heathcote as Alf
 Carl Duering as Rossi Stubbins
 John Boxer as Flight Sergeant Box
 Harry Locke as Medical Orderly
 Michael Balfour as American Sergeant
 Guido Lorraine as German officer
 Walter Gotell as German sentry (uncredited)

Production

The Red Beret was based on a novel published in 1950. Film rights were bought by Irving Allen who announced Trevor Howard and Leo Genn for the leading roles. Hillary St George Saunders, who wrote the novel, was to work on the screenplay, but died during pre-production. Terence Young was signed to direct and write a script. The working title was The Red Devils.

The Red Beret was originally intended to be a co-production with RKO Pictures, but they and Warwick were unable to come to terms, so Warwick made a deal with Columbia instead.

Terence Young's original choice for the lead, former Second World War Para Richard Todd turned the role down as being "too far fetched". Ray Milland was also originally announced as landing the leading role.

Former agent Albert R. Broccoli knew that Alan Ladd was unhappy with Paramount due to a new contract for much less money. Broccoli met Ladd and his wife and agent Sue Carol who agreed to a three-picture contract with Warwick provided Ladd's scriptwriter Richard Maibaum was allowed to rewrite the screenplay for Ladd.

Although Ladd's most popular and critically acclaimed film, Shane, was filmed earlier. it was also released in 1953, making him a prime box office attraction. Ladd was paid US$200,000, first class travel and accommodations for himself, his wife, their four children and their nurse, and 10 per cent of the gross receipts over US$2,000,000 for his 11 weeks work filming The Red Beret.

Ladd wanted work done on the script and recommended Richard Maibaum, with whom he had worked several times while at Paramount. Warwick hired him and this began a long professional relationship between Broccoli and Maibaum. In addition to director Young and screenwriter Maibaum, camera operator Ted Moore and stuntman Bob Simmons worked extensively on future Warwick and Eon Productions films, as did actor Walter Gotell, who appeared as a German sentry. Johanna Harwood who worked on the continuity co-wrote the screenplays for the first two Bond films.

Although there was some public criticism of an American playing the lead in a British war film, British cinema owners responded that Hollywood stars filled their cinema seats, unlike most local actors. Ladd himself explained that his character had enlisted in the Parachute Regiment to learn from them. The Parachute Regiment provided extras, facilities and locations at the RAF Abingdon Parachute School, Abingdon, Oxfordshire and at Trawsfynydd, North Wales. Studio work took place at Shepperton.

The female lead was originally meant to be played by Dianne Foster but she was unable to make it due to a scheduling conflict. She was replaced by Susan Stephen.

Actor Leo Glen served in the British Army in World War Two,  reaching the rank of Lt. Colonel.  Alan Ladd was initially attached to the American Air Force Film Unit but was discharged due to stomach disorders.  Subsequently he was classified as A1 but thanks to pressure from film studios, his draft was postponed and finally in 1945 was removed from the draft along with all men over 30.

Reception

The Red Beret was a hit at the British box office. According to producer Allen, it recouped its cost from the British market alone. The film cost US$700,000 to make and grossed US$8 million worldwide. It earned US$225,000 in France.

References

Bibliography

 Broccoli, Albert R.; and Donald Zec. When the Snow Melts: The Autobiography of Cubby Broccoli. Philadelphia, Pennsylvania: Trans-Atlantic Publications, 1999. .
 Chapman, James. Licence to Thrill: A Cultural History of the James Bond Films. New York: Columbia University Press, 2001. .
 Mackenzie, S.P. British War Films, 1939–1945: The Cinema and the Services. London: Hambledon, 2007. .
 Maibaum, Richard, Backstory: Interviews with Screenwriters of Hollywood's Golden Age. Berkeley, California: University of California Press, 1988, first edition 1986. . 
 Todd, Richard. Caught in the Act: The Story of My Life. London: Hutchinson, 1986. .

The use of the names 'Box' and 'Snow' for the Bruneval raid section of the film , is a deliberate tribute to Sgt 'Cox' and Col 'Frost' who took part- hence the play on names. The 'Czech' played by Jewish Refugee actor Anton Differing is a tribute to the actual German Jewish Para Pte P. Newman, real Name Peter Nagel, who went on the raid to question and bring back German prisoners. He later went on the St Nazaire raid as Pte Walker and was POW but survived the war;he was the only British Commando to take part in both raids. For his full story see chapter in book 'Fighting Back' by Martin Sugarman (Valentine Mitchell 2017)

External links
 
 
 
 

1953 films
1950s war films
British aviation films
British war films
Columbia Pictures films
Films directed by Terence Young
Films scored by John Addison
Films set in England
North African campaign films
Films with screenplays by Richard Maibaum
British World War II films
1950s English-language films
1950s British films